Gilles Simon was the defending champion but chose not  to participate. Jarkko Nieminen won in the final against Julien Benneteau 6–2, 7–5.

Seeds
The top four seeds received a bye into the second round.

Draw

Finals

Top half

Bottom half

Qualifying draw

Seeds

Qualifiers

Lucky loser
  Ryan Sweeting

First qualifier

Second qualifier

Third qualifier

Fourth qualifier

References
 Main Draw
 Qualifying Draw

Men's Singles